is a station in Hamada, Shimane Prefecture, Japan.

Lines
West Japan Railway Company (JR West)
Sanin Main Line

Layout
The station has a side platform and two tracks.

Adjacent stations
West Japan Railway Company (JR West)

Railway stations in Japan opened in 1922
Railway stations in Shimane Prefecture
Sanin Main Line